José Félix Fernández Estigarribia (born 4 February 1941) is a Paraguayan politician and diplomat.
He studied law at the National University of Asunción.

He served twice as Foreign Minister of Paraguay, first under Luis González Macchi (1999-2000) and then under Federico Franco (2012-2013).

A member of the Authentic Radical Liberal Party, he has been Representative and Senator.

He was also Secretary General of ALADI.

References

External links
 Minister Fernández Estigarribia

1941 births
Living people
Foreign Ministers of Paraguay
Members of the Senate of Paraguay
Paraguayan diplomats
Paraguayan politicians
People from Asunción
Universidad Nacional de Asunción alumni
20th-century Paraguayan lawyers